Galatians 5 is the fifth chapter of the Epistle to the Galatians in the New Testament of the Christian Bible. It is authored by Paul the Apostle for the churches in Galatia, written between AD 49–58. This chapter contains a discussion about circumcision and the allegory of the "Fruit of the Holy Spirit".

Text 
The original text was written in Koine Greek. This chapter is divided into 26 verses.

Old Testament references
Galatians 5:14:

Verse 1
New King James Version
Stand fast therefore in the liberty by which Christ has made us free, and do not be entangled again with a yoke of bondage.
New Revised Standard Version
For freedom Christ has set us free.
Stand firm, therefore, and do not submit again to a yoke of slavery.
The Greek of the verse's first part is considered awkward, that among many possibilities, it is suggested to be a conclusion of the Hagar-Sarah allegory or a short independent bridging paragraph between the allegory and the new themes in the chapters 5 and 6.

Neither Circumcision Nor Uncircumcision (5:2–12)
These verses bring up the central theme which is mentioned in chapter 2 about the chasm between "being justified by the law" and "living by faith through the Spirit", in this case a theme that is related to circumcision.

Verse 6
For in Christ Jesus neither circumcision nor uncircumcision avails anything, but faith working through love.

Living by the Spirit (5:13–26)

In this section Paul contrasts "living by the Spirit" with "gratifying the desires of the flesh", which are two opposing ways of living.

Verse 14
For all the law is fulfilled in one word, even in this: "You shall love your neighbor as yourself."
Using the citation from  Paul speaks positively about the law which is "fulfilled" in the coming of Christ.

Works of the Flesh
Paul lists the works of the flesh (verses 19–21) as the behaviors that would prevent individuals from inheriting the kingdom of God.

English Standard Version

Good News Translation

The lists or catalogues of vices (and also lists of virtues such the one in Galatians 5:22-23) were a form of ethical instruction very common in the Greco-Roman world.

Fruit of the Holy Spirit

"The fruit of the Spirit": the Ethiopian version reads "...of the Holy Spirit". Referring to the "internal principle of grace", called the Spirit, and the graces of which are called "fruit", not "works" (which refers to the actions of the flesh). It is in the form of a "list of virtues", which has no comparable juxtaposition lists in the contemporary writings; the closest parallel in the New Testament is perhaps .

"Love": may be understood as "love to God", and also "love to Christ", which the teaches people to love the neighbors; furthermore, "love to the house and worship of God", to the truths and ordinances of the Gospel.

"Joy": which is in the Holy Spirit, has him for its author and the object of it is God, as a covenant God and Father in Christ. Moreover, joy in the good of others, of fellow creatures.

"Peace": refers to the peace produced through the application of the blood of Christ for pardon, and for justification to the sinner's soul, to yield the peace, quietness, and tranquillity of mind. It is also be the peace with all others, under a work of the God's Spirit of God, to live peaceably with all people.

"Longsuffering" and "kindness": instead of a "patient waiting" for good things or more grace or glory to come, it is a "patient bearing and enduring", through the Spirit, of the present evils with gladness; being slow to anger, ready to forgive mistakes, and bear with as well as forbear one another, accompanied with gentleness, humanity, affability, courteousness, in words, gestures, and actions, to be an imitation of the gentleness of Christ.

"Goodness"(): acts of goodness to men, in a natural, civil, moral, spiritual, and evangelic manner, for the benefit both of soul and body, and is well pleasing to God when performed in the exercise of the grace.

"Faith" or "faithfulness": Fidelity, both in words and in deeds, is very significant in the Gospel, and a profession of belief. Faith in Christ is a gift of God, and the work of his Spirit, leading a person into believing in Christ for salvation, and making a "profession of faith".

"Meekness" or "gentleness": refers to humility ("lowliness of mind") which is patterned after Christ and transcribed by the Holy Spirit from Christ into the heart of a regenerate person; thus, walking humbly with God, acknowledging as well as being thankful for every blessing, and depending on his grace, while behaving with modesty and humility among people.

"Temperance or self-control" or "continence": refers to "chastity and sobriety", such as moderation in eating and drinking.

 "Against such there is no law": The listed virtues are perfectly agreeable to the law of God. The persons possessing the virtues of the 'fruit' have nothing to fear from the law.

See also
 Fruit of the Holy Spirit
 Related Bible parts: Leviticus 19, Psalm 92, Proverbs 11, Matthew 3.

Notes

References

Bibliography

External links
 King James Bible - Wikisource
English Translation with Parallel Latin Vulgate
Online Bible at GospelHall.org (ESV, KJV, Darby, American Standard Version, Bible in Basic English)
Multiple bible versions at Bible Gateway (NKJV, NIV, NRSV etc.)

05